Dioecrescis is a monotypic genus of flowering plants in the family Rubiaceae. The genus contains only one species, viz. Dioecrescis erythroclada, which is found in India and Indochina.

References

Monotypic Rubiaceae genera
Flora of India (region)
Flora of Indo-China